The Francois Deruyts Prize, or Prix Francois Deruyts, is awarded every four years to recognize progress in synthetic or analytic superior geometry.  It was established in 1902 by the Académie Royale de Belgique, Classe des Sciences, and carries a monetary award. Originally recipients had to be Belgian, but currently EU nationals are eligible.

Recipients 
The recipients of the Francois Deruyts Prize are:

 1906: Modeste Stuyvaert
 1910: Joseph Fairon
 1914: Lucien Godeaux
 1918: No award
 1926: No award
 1930: Roland Deaux
 1934: Augustin Delgleize
 1938: Pol Burniat
 1938: Octave Rozet
 1942: Pierre Defrise
 1946: François Jongmans
 1946: Louis Nollet
 1950: Léon-Élie Derwidué
 1954: Guy Hirsch
 1958: Fernand Backes
 1962: Paul Dedecker
 1962: Jacques Tits
 1966: No award
 1970: J.A. Thas
 1974: Pierre Deligne
 1978: Michel Cahen
 1982: Francis Buekenhout
 1986: Pierre Lecomte
 1990: Luc Haine
 1994: Luc Lemaire
 1998: Simone Gutt
 2002: Yves Félix
 2006: Frédéric Bourgeois
 2010: Lorenz Johannes Schwachhöfer
 2014: Pascal Lambrechts
 2018: Dimitri Leemans

See also

 List of mathematics awards

References

Mathematics awards
1902 establishments in Belgium
Awards established in 1902